Marc Gonçalves Mucha (19 August 1994 in Arcos – Anadia) is a Portuguese footballer who plays for S.C. Beira-Mar, as a forward.

Football career
On 31 July 2013, Mucha made his professional debut with Beira-Mar in a 2013–14 Taça da Liga match against Trofense, replacing Batatinha (91th minute).

References

External links

Stats and profile at LPFP

1994 births
Living people
Portuguese footballers
Association football forwards
Liga Portugal 2 players
S.C. Beira-Mar players
People from Anadia, Portugal
Sportspeople from Aveiro District
21st-century Portuguese people